Hopea foxworthyi is an evergreen tree of the family Dipterocarpaceae. It is endemic to Sibuyan Island in the Philippines.

The species has been designated as endangered by the International Union for Conservation of Nature (IUCN). The survival of this tree in the wild is threatened by widespread harvesting of its wood which is used as construction timber.

References

foxworthyi
Endemic flora of the Philippines
Trees of the Philippines
Taxonomy articles created by Polbot